The Neon Bible is a 1995 drama film written and directed by Terence Davies, based on the novel of the same name by John Kennedy Toole. The film is about a boy named David (Jacob Tierney) coming of age in Georgia in the 1940s. His abusive father (Denis Leary) enlists in the army during World War II and disappears, leaving David to take care of his mother (Diana Scarwid) with his Aunt Mae (Gena Rowlands), who is a singer. It was filmed in Atlanta, Crawfordville, and Madison, Georgia.

The film was released in France in August 1995, the United Kingdom in October 1995, Australia in November 1995, and released in the United States on 1 March 1996. It was a selection of the 1995 New York Film Festival.

Cast
 Jacob Tierney as David, aged 15
 Drake Bell as David, aged 10
 Gena Rowlands as Mae Morgan
 Diana Scarwid as Sarah
 Denis Leary as Frank
 Bob Hannah as George
 Aaron Frisch as Bruce
 Charles Franzen as Tannoy Voice
 Leo Burmester as Bobbie Lee Taylor
 Sherry Velvet as First Testifier
 Stephanie Astalos-Jones as Second Testifier
 Ian Shearer as Billy Sunday Thompson
 Joan Glover as Flora
 Jill Jane Clements as Woman
 Tom Turbiville as Clyde
 Sharon Blackwood as Schoolmistress
 Peter McRobbie as Reverend Watkins
 Ken Fight as Schoolmaster
 Dana Seltzer (credited as Dana Atwood) as Jo Lynne
 Virgil Graham Hopkins as Mr. Williams
 Ducan Stewart as Boy in Drugstore
 J.T. Alessi as Boy in Drugstore
 Duncan Stewart as Head Boy
 Frances Conroy as Miss Scover
 Marcus Batton as School Boy

Reception
The film was entered into the 1995 Cannes Film Festival. San Francisco Chronicle film critic Edward Guthmann said the film was poorly received when it premiered at Cannes, but called it "gorgeous" and "one of the year's most beautiful films." He said it was a rewarding film that requires a little faith from the viewer due to long, slow, "lingering shots that work as a kind of meditation." He described the revival meeting at night "like an Edward Hopper or Thomas Hart Benton painting come to life." Judd Blaise of Allmovie gave the film 2½ out of 5 stars and said "Some viewers will likely be frustrated by the slow pace and elliptical style, though others may be transfixed by the often stunning photography and poetic approach." The New York Times film critic Stephen Holden said one of the problems with the film was that it "may have succumbed to its own dreamy esthetic" by focusing on the same image too often, and that the end of the film "loses its balance."

Stephen Brophy, a staff reporter for The Tech, said "Terence Davies' latest film looks as ravishing as Distant Voices, Still Lives, or The Long Day Closes... If it weren't for the absurdity of the climax and its lack of relevance to all that has gone before, The Neon Bible could be highly recommended. Too bad." San Francisco Examiner critic Barry Walters said the film was "unrelentingly downbeat" and that "it starts off dark and gets darker". He called it "one long crawl into an emotional abyss without catharsis" and said that Davies had created a nightmare.

Jonathan Rosenbaum wrote: "Davies doesn’t offer a cinema of plot or a cinema of ideas, but a cinema of raw feelings and incandescent moments that wash over you like waves. You might find some of these waves boring if you assume that each one has to make a separate point to justify its existence."

In an interview with Time Out Film, Davies said "The Neon Bible doesn't work, and that's entirely my fault. The only thing I can say is that it's a transition work. And I couldn't have done The House of Mirth without it."

Shown on three screens in the United States, the film grossed $78,072 in its theatrical release.

References

External links
 
 
 
 

1995 drama films
1995 films
British drama films
Films based on American novels
Films set in Georgia (U.S. state)
Films shot in Georgia (U.S. state)
Southern Gothic films
Films directed by Terence Davies
Films produced by Elizabeth Karlsen
1990s English-language films
1990s British films